Activate may refer to:

Arts and entertainment
 Activate (album), by Back Door
 Activated (album), by Tee Grizzley
 "Activate", a 2006 song by Stellar Kart from We Can't Stand Sitting Down
 "Activated", a 2016 song by Cher Lloyd
 "Activated", a 1989 song by Gerald Alston

Organisations
 Activate (organisation), a British political organisation
 Activate Learning, an English education group
 Honduras Activate, a health organisation

See also
 Activation
 Activator (disambiguation)